Debajit Tripura is an Indian politician and elected member of the Tripura Tribal Areas Autonomous District Council (TTAADC). He was elected from the Purba Muhuripur Bhuratali constituency.

Debajit Tripura is the zonal chairman of Tripura Tribal Areas Autonomous District Council from south zone.

References 

Tripura politicians
Living people
Year of birth missing (living people)